Oldfield is an unincorporated community in Livingston Parish, Louisiana, United States.

Salem Baptist Church
The historic Salem Baptist Church held the first service here on Sept. 11, 1854. The original building was located near the bank of the Colyell Creek. Then sometime in 1886 a second larger building was erected on what is now the cemetery hill. Then in 1908 a tornado destroyed the church and it was rebuilt in 1909. After additional storm damage the church members decided to move the church. In March 1943, the first services were held in the new building.

Salem Cemetery
The historic Salem cemetery is located here.

References

Unincorporated communities in Livingston Parish, Louisiana
Unincorporated communities in Louisiana